John F. Doran   is a former Major League Baseball pitcher. He played in the majors for the  Louisville Colonels of the American Association during the 1891 season. He remained active in the minor leagues through 1895.

External links

1867 births
Major League Baseball pitchers
19th-century baseball players
Louisville Colonels players
Wilkes-Barre Barons (baseball) players
Jersey City Skeeters players
New Haven Nutmegs players
Troy Trojans (minor league) players
Albany Senators players
New Orleans Pelicans (baseball) players
Mobile Blackbirds players
Buffalo Bisons (minor league) players
Scranton Indians players
Shenandoah Huns players
Harrisburg Senators players
Year of death missing
Baseball players from Chicago